Bolla is a type of serpentic dragon in ancient Albanian folklore.

Bolla may also refer to:

 Bolla (name), given name and surname
 Bolla (butterfly), a genus of spread-winged skipper
 Bolla, Sierra de Gata, a summit of the Sierra de Gata range, Extremadura, Spain

See also
Bola (disambiguation)